Bhagwantgad Fort  is a fort located 18 km from Malvan, in Sindhudurg district, of Maharashtra. This fort is located on the northern bank of Gad river or Kalaval creek. The fort is spread over an area of 1.5 acres and covered with dense vegetation.

History
This fort was built by Pant Pratinidhi to check the activities of Sawants of Sawantwadi. The Bavdekar had built this fort immediately after the Sawant's had built fort Bharatgad in the village Masure on the southern bank of Kalaval creek. This fort was under the control of Chhatrapati of Kolhapur. However, in few years this fort was brought under the control of sawants of Sawantwadi. In 1748 Tulaji Angre, the son of Kanhoji Angre tried to capture the fort but, was unsuccessful due to strong resistance from the fort commandant for 18 months. On 29 March 1818, the 4th rifles of East India company under the leadership of captain Gray and Pierson captured this fort. After the garrison noticed that the British troops had crossed the creek, they abandoned the fort.

How to reach
The nearest town is Malvan which is 526 km from Mumbai. The base village of the fort is Masure. The Bharatgad and Bhadwantgad forts can be visited in a single day. There are good hotels at Malvan, now tea and snacks are also available in small hotels on the way to Masure. Small boats are available from the village Kavawadi or Kawamasure to cross the Kalaval creek.

Places to see
The gates and bastion are in a ruined state. The only structure in good condition is Siddheshwar temple. It takes about an hour to visit all places on the fort.

See also 
 List of forts in Maharashtra
 List of forts in India
 Sawantwadi State
 Marathi People
 Maratha Navy
 List of Maratha dynasties and states
 Maratha War of Independence
 Battles involving the Maratha Empire
 Maratha Army
 Maratha titles
 Military history of India
 List of people involved in the Maratha Empire

References 

Buildings and structures of the Maratha Empire
16th-century forts in India
Buildings and structures in Maharashtra